Group 1 consisted of four of the 32 teams entered into the European zone: Austria, Hungary, Malta, and Sweden. These four teams competed on a home-and-away basis for one of the 9,5 spots in the final tournament allocated to the European zone, with the group's winner claiming this spot.

Standings

Matches

 

 

 

 

 

 

 

 

 

 

 

Austria and Sweden finished level on points and goal difference, and a play-off on neutral ground was played to decide who would qualify.

Notes

External links 
Group 1 Detailed Results at RSSSF

1
1972–73 in Austrian football
1973–74 in Austrian football
1972–73 in Hungarian football
1973–74 in Hungarian football
1972–73 in Maltese football
1973–74 in Maltese football
1972 in Swedish football
1973 in Swedish football